Martha Liliana Hernández Florián (born 20 May 1988) is a Colombian Paralympic athlete who competes in sprint and shot put events at international elite competitions. She is a Paralympic bronze medalist and a Parapan American Games champion in 100 metres and shot put respectively.

References

1988 births
Living people
Paralympic athletes of Colombia
Colombian female sprinters
Colombian female shot putters
Athletes (track and field) at the 2012 Summer Paralympics
Athletes (track and field) at the 2016 Summer Paralympics
Medalists at the 2016 Summer Paralympics
Medalists at the 2015 Parapan American Games
Medalists at the 2019 Parapan American Games
Sportspeople from Magdalena Department
21st-century Colombian women